Jane Bethel Leslie (August 3, 1929 – November 28, 1999) was an American actress and screenwriter. In her career spanning half a century, she was nominated for a Primetime Emmy Award and a Laurel Award in 1964, a Tony Award in 1986, and a CableACE Award in 1988.

Early years
Bethel Leslie was born in New York, New York.  Her parents were a lawyer, Warren Leslie, and Jane Leslie, a newspaperwoman. Bethel was a student at Brearley School in New York City.

While a 13-year-old student at Brearley School, Leslie was discovered by George Abbott, who cast her in the play Snafu in 1944. In a 1965 newspaper article, Leslie described herself as "a 'quick study' -- able to learn my lines rather fast."

Stage
Over the next four decades she appeared in a number of Broadway productions, including Goodbye, My Fancy (1948), The Time of the Cuckoo (1952), Inherit the Wind (1955), Catch Me If You Can (1965), and Long Day's Journey Into Night (1986).

In 1950, Leslie was cast as Cornelia Otis Skinner in The Girls, a television series based on the author's Our Hearts Were Young and Gay. She departed the show after two months to appear with Helen Hayes in the play The Wisteria Trees, adapted from Anton Chekhov's The Cherry Orchard by Joshua Logan.

Television
Leslie began working in television in the 1940s and frequently was a guest on the many anthology series popular in the early to mid-1950s, such as Studio One and Playhouse 90. She appeared with Ronald W. Reagan and Stafford Repp in the 1960 episode "The Way Home" of CBS's The DuPont Show with June Allyson.  Later, she was one of the repertory of actors starring in The Richard Boone Show (1963-1964).

Leslie made three guest appearances on Perry Mason, and was featured as Perry's client in all three episodes. In 1958, she played Janet Morris in "The Case of the Fugitive Nurse" and Evelyn Girard in "The Case of the Purple Woman". In 1960 she played Sylvia Sutton in "The Case of the Wayward Wife". 

In 1962, she portrayed the part of Martha Hastings in the episode, "The Long Count", on CBS's Rawhide.

Leslie also guest starred in many western television series, including The Texan, Mackenzie's Raiders (as Lucinda Cabot in "The Lucinda Cabot Affair"), The Man from Blackhawk, Riverboat, Wanted: Dead or Alive (episode "Secret Ballot"), Trackdown (episode "False Witness"), Bat Masterson, The Rifleman, Gunsmoke'(1962 season 7 episode 29 The Summons as Rose Ellen)' (as Elsa Poe in S10E12 episode “Innocence”, 1964), Maverick, Pony Express, Stagecoach West, Bonanza, The Wild Wild West, Have Gun - Will Travel with Richard Boone, and Wagon Train (Season 8, Episode 20). The Virginian (Season 1, Episode 23, “The Money Cage”).

Her other credits were on drama series, such as Alfred Hitchcock Presents, Richard Diamond, Private Detective and The Fugitive, both starring David Janssen;  The Eleventh Hour, The Lloyd Bridges Show, Mannix, Route 66 (episodes "The Layout at Glen Canyon" and "City of Wheels"), Straightaway, Bus Stop, Target: The Corruptors!, The Investigators, The Man and the Challenge, Adventures in Paradise, Ben Casey, One Step Beyond, Thriller, Empire, and a later western, The High Chaparral.

Leslie became a regular on the NBC soap, The Doctors, when she took over the role of "Maggie Powers" after Ann Williams left the part.  Leslie was also featured in the 1964 episode "The Fluellen Family" in the NBC western Daniel Boone, starring Fess Parker. She had recurring roles on Another World and All My Children and was featured in the television adaptations of In Cold Blood and Saint Maybe.

Writing
Leslie was the head writer for The Secret Storm in 1970. She also scripted episodes for Gunsmoke, Bracken's World, Barnaby Jones, McCloud, The New Land, Matt Helm, and Falcon Crest. In 1970, producer Howard Christie referred to Leslie as "a good actress who has turned into a fine scriptwriter."

Film
Leslie's debut in feature films came in 1964 in Captain Newman, M.D.. Her feature film credits include A Rage to Live (1965), The Molly Maguires (1970), with Sean Connery, Dr. Cook's Garden (1971), Old Boyfriends (1979), Ironweed (1987), Message in a Bottle (1999) and Uninvited (1999).

Partial Television Appearances

Awards and recognition
Leslie was a regular on NBC's The Richard Boone Show, which garnered her an Emmy Award nomination for Outstanding Single Performance by an Actress in a Leading Role for her work in the episode "Statement of Fact." Media critic John Crosby wrote about Leslie's work in that anthology series, "During the season Bethel played everything from a seductive ax murderess to a dumb gangster's moll, to an Irish scrub woman, through a whole series of witchy mothers."

A poll of media critics and editors named her Most Promising New Talent in Radio Television Daily's 1963 All-American Favorites—Television.

Leslie's 1986 Broadway portrayal of a drug-addicted mother in Long Day's Journey into Night'' brought her a Tony Award nomination for Best Featured Actress.

Family
Leslie was married to director Andrew McCullough. They had one child, daughter Leslie McCullough.
She had a brother, writer Warren Leslie.

Death
Bethel Leslie died of cancer at 70 in her Manhattan apartment.

Radio appearances

References

External links

 
 
 
 

American stage actresses
American television actresses
American film actresses
Screenwriters from New York (state)
Actresses from New York City
Actresses from Los Angeles
1929 births
1999 deaths
Deaths from cancer in New York (state)
American women screenwriters
American soap opera writers
20th-century American actresses
Women soap opera writers
20th-century American women writers
Western (genre) television actors
Brearley School alumni
Screenwriters from California
20th-century American screenwriters